Avazbek Otkeev ({born 4 December 1993) is a Kyrgyzstani footballer who plays for Dordoi Bishkek in the Kyrgyzstan League and Kyrgyzstan national football team as a midfielder.

Career statistics

International
Statistics accurate as of match played 21 January 2019

Statistics accurate as of match played 16 October 2018

References

External links

1993 births
Living people
Kyrgyzstan international footballers
Kyrgyzstani footballers
FC Dordoi Bishkek players
Association football midfielders
Footballers at the 2014 Asian Games
Asian Games competitors for Kyrgyzstan